

Songs

Tributes
 Neruda en el Corazón
 Track: A Callarse

 XXX: Tributo a José Alfredo Jiménez
 Track: Serenta Sin Luna

 Los Shajato: Tributo a John Lenon
 Track: Blackbird and You've Got To Hide Your Love Away

 Entre Todas las Mujeres: Voces de Mujer Cantan a Joaquín Sabina
 Track: Corre, Dijo La Tortuga

 Volcán: Un Tributo a José José
 Track: El Triste

 Soda Stereo: Tributo
 Track: Disco Eterno

 El Más Grande Homenaje A Los Tigres del Norte
 Track: La Jaula de Oro

 Calamaro Querido: Cantando al Salmón (Parte 2)
 Track: Sin Documentos (track also included in the album "Limón y Sal")

 Papito
 Track: Morena Mia" (Feat. Miguel Bosé)

 Cantora 1
 Track: Sabiéndose de Los Descalzos (Feat. Mercedes Sosa)

 Homenaje A Chavela Vargas
 Track: Las Ciudades

As featured artist

References

Venegas, Julieta